Noradrenergic cell group A7 is a group of cells fluorescent for norepinephrine that is located in the pontine reticular formation ventral to the superior cerebellar peduncle of the pons in rodents and in primates.

References

External links 
 BrainInfo

Norepinephrine